Progynon Depot may refer to:

 Estradiol valerate
 Estradiol undecylate

See also
 Progynon